Alenia may refer to:

Companies
 Alenia Aermacchi, an Italian aeronautics company, founded in 2012
 Alenia Aeronautica, a former Italian aeronautics company, founded in 1990 and merged into Alenia Aermacchi

 Alenia Marconi Systems, a former Anglo-Italian defence electronics company
 Alenia Spazio, an Italian aerospace company (now Thales Alenia Space)

Other uses
 Alenia (butterfly), a genus of skippers in the family Hesperiidae